.doc (an abbreviation of "document") is a filename extension used for word processing documents stored on Microsoft's proprietary Microsoft Word Binary File Format. Microsoft has used the extension since 1983.

Microsoft Word Binary File Format

Binary DOC files often contain more text formatting information (as well as scripts and undo information) than some other document file formats like Rich Text Format and Hypertext Markup Language, but are usually less widely compatible.

The DOC files created with Microsoft Word versions differ. Microsoft Word versions before Word 97 ("8.0") used a different format from the  OLE and  CFBF-based Microsoft Word 97 – 2003.

In Microsoft Word 2007 and later, the binary file format was replaced as the default format by the Office Open XML format, though Microsoft Word can still produce DOC files.

Application support

The DOC format is native to Microsoft Word. Other word processors, such as OpenOffice.org Writer, IBM Lotus Symphony, Apple Pages and AbiWord, can also create and read DOC files, although with some limitations. Command line programs for Unix-like operating systems that can convert files from the DOC format to plain text or other standard formats include the wv library, which itself is used directly by AbiWord.

Specification
Because the DOC file format was a closed specification for many years, inconsistent handling of the format persists and may cause some loss of formatting information when handling the same file with multiple word processing programs. Some specifications for Microsoft Office 97 binary file formats were published in 1997 under a restrictive license, but these specifications were removed from online download in 1999. Specifications of later versions of Microsoft Office binary file formats were not publicly available. The DOC format specification was available from Microsoft on request since 2006 under restrictive RAND-Z terms until February 2008. Sun Microsystems and OpenOffice.org reverse engineered the file format. On February 15, 2008, Microsoft released a .DOC format specification under the Microsoft Open Specification Promise. However, this specification does not describe all of the features used by DOC format and reverse engineered work remains necessary. Since 2008 the specification has been updated several times; the latest change was made in May 2022.

The format used in earlier, pre-97 ("1.0" 1989 through "7.0" 1995) versions of Word are less known, but both OpenOffice and LibreOffice contain open-source code for reading these formats. The format is probably related to the "Stream" format found in similar Excel versions. Word 95 also seems to have an OLE-wrapped form

Other file formats 
Some historical documentations may use the DOC filename extension for plain-text files, indicating documentation for software or hardware. The DOC filename extension was also used during the 1980s by WordPerfect for its proprietary format.

DOC is sometimes used by users of Palm OS as shorthand for PalmDoc, an unrelated format (commonly using PDB filename extension) used to encode text files such as ebooks.

See also
 docx, the file format used by modern versions of Word
De facto standard
 Dominant design

References

External links 
DOC, XLS, and PPT specifications
Microsoft Compound Document Format - OpenOffice.org

Computer file formats
Microsoft Office